The Ñu Guasú Park (Spanish: Parque Ñu Guasú) is an urban park located in Luque, in the Greater Asuncion area, in Paraguay, near the Silvio Pettirossi International Airport. It was turned into a recreational park covering 25 hectares. It is maintained through the Communications and Public Constructions Ministry of Paraguay, through the Public Constructions Direction, dependent of the Vice-Ministry. Ñu Guasú Park has a 5-kilometer walking/jogging path and a 1.2-kilometer bicycle path. It also has soccer, volleyball, basketball, and tennis facilities. There is no cost to enter the park.

History

2000's
In November 2001, the Ejército del Pueblo Paraguayo kidnapped María Edith Bordón de Debernardi at the Park. In March 2003, former model Mariángela Martinez Houstin was kidnapped at the Park. In March 2005, a worker of Paraguay's Embassy in Buenos Aires was robbed at the parking lot site of the Park. In September 2008, a fire destroyed a small part of the grass at the Parque Ñu Guazú. In October 2008, the Gran Corrida Americana run was disputed at the Parque Ñu Guazú to help Paraguay's Chaco. In November 2008, the first WWF volunteer tree planting day was held at the park. In 2009, the Bosque de la Memoria was launched.

2020's
On 5 April 2021, the Parque Ñu Guazú re-opened its doors following the COVID-19 pandemic.

Reference

Parks in Paraguay
Central Department
Cross country running venues